Darwyn were an alternative rock and acoustic band from Essex. The band featured Matt Cardle as the lead singer and acoustic guitar player. The other Darwyn members were Ali McMillan on drums and percussion and Richard Grace on piano. The band members met at Lights Music Action and formed Darwyn in 2005.

Career

2005:  Formation
The band, who described themselves as acoustic rock, recorded the 11 track album When You Wake in 2006, which included the tracks "Violet" and "When You Wake". They were subsequently awarded an Arts Council England grant which they used to record the follow up EP Little Sunlight in 2007 which included the track "Junior".
The band played at many festivals including Stortford Music Festival and Brownstock Festival and regularly played at the venue and recording studio Highbarn in Essex.

Cardle and McMillan also played as a two piece under the name Darwyn playing acoustic cover versions of popular songs in venues in and around the Suffolk area  and videos of them playing together have gained many views on YouTube.

2006: When You Wake 
Darwyn released their Studio album When You Wake in 2006.

2007-08: Little Sunlight
In 2007 Darwyn released their second album Little Sunlight.

2009-10: Split up
In 2010, the band split and Cardle joined a new band called Seven Summers.

Discography

Studio albums

References

External links 
 Darwyn on Myspace
 Ali McMillan -
 LMA 2016 : Llama to the Core Lights Music Action

English rock music groups
Music in Essex
Musical groups established in 2005